Carl B. Stiger (February 21, 1883 – August 22, 1977) was a justice of the Iowa Supreme Court from February 15, 1936, to December 31, 1942. He was appointed from Tama County, Iowa.

References

External links

Justices of the Iowa Supreme Court
1883 births
1977 deaths
20th-century American judges